Find Me in Paris is an English-language teen science-fantasy dramedy series that premiered on April 14, 2018, on Hulu, produced by ZDF and Cottonwood Media. The series is filmed on location in Paris, in areas such as the Palais Garnier and Opera National de Paris. The second season, consisting of 26 episodes, premiered on August 16, 2019. Later that year, the series was renewed for a third and final season, which premiered on August 21, 2020. Find Me in Paris is available in over 130 countries.

In 2022, an upcoming successor series by the same creators and producers titled Spellbound was announced. The new series would be set in the same location of the Paris Opera Ballet School, but with a new cast of characters and a focus on magic rather than time travel.

Plot

Season 1
Helena 'Lena' Grisky, a Russian princess from 1905, is training to be a ballerina at the Opéra de Paris and is the school's top student. Her boyfriend Henri is unaware that his family are time travellers, and he discovers a time-piece hidden by his father, which he gives to Lena as a gift, thinking it is just a piece of jewellery. Lena is transported and trapped in the year of 2018, leaving Henri battling to find a way to bring her back and to fight off the Time Collectors, who set out to capture Lena.

Meanwhile in 2018, Lena must continue to attend ballet school at the modern Opéra de Paris in order to keep her identity a secret and remain in Paris until she can return to 1905. However, despite wanting to return to 1905, Lena soon settles into her new time period and makes new friends in some of the school's other students - Jeff, Dash and Ines, who becomes her best friend and the first to discover her secret. However, she also finds a rival in the ruthless Thea, who sees Lena as a threat to her ambition to be the school's best dancer. To make things even more complicated, even though Lena has not forgotten Henri, she ends up falling for Max, who becomes her dance partner. She also finds a love for a new dance genre, hip-hop, when she joins Max's dance group called the BLOK. With all these conflictions, Lena is left with a dilemma: return to 1905 or stay in the future.

Season 2
When Lena travels back to 1905, it is reported to the time travel bureau that someone has entered the wrong century. It is then revealed that Lena was actually born in the 21st-century, but was sent to the 20th-century as a newborn. Lena and Henri become separated in different time zones, and write letters to each other throughout the season. Thea discovers the Time Collectors, and begins a relationship with Frank, using his time travelling device.

Frank and Thea devise a plan to control Time Travel but things go awry when a rookie Bureau agent, Lex, decides to fix things without qualifications. She soon begins to interfere with Lena's life and causes problems. Whilst at the school, Lena joins Max in a risky dance that injures his knee. Max is ruled out for dancing leaving Lena and Jeff to fight for ownership of the BLOK. They decide to create one group and join the American competition series called, Dance Off. Later on, Lena is ready to return to her Time Period but then Travels to 1983 with, Jeff, Inez and Isaac by mistake. Lex struggles to comprehend what has happened but then gets deleted by Captain Nico Michaels, a high ranking teen in the Bureau. She is deleted for unauthorised interference with Time Travel. Frank and Thea get thrown into 1905 and combining the powers of the Time Pieces Clive and Pinky are lost.

Season 3

The season starts with Lena and the gang's memories erased. For First Division, they have been chosen to join Mr Castillo's experimental workshop in the South of France for the first half of the year. Nico goes undercover as a student, taking Max's place as Lena's dance partner. A younger dancer named Romy shows up to the workshop, wanting to take part. Later, she finds photos of Lena from 1905 in her house and wants to investigate despite her skeptical friend Simon's dissuasion.

Lena has dreams and flashbacks of time travel and her 1905 life she can't make sense of. Whenever she or Ines remember, they forget again. They attempt to piece things together with notes, but Nico sabotages them. Frank sends Claudine to the future to figure out Nico's intentions with Lena. Henri arrives in the South and realises Lena's lost her memories. After a few tries, she manages to get them back after a kiss. Romy, who's now in on it, introduces Lena to her father, who reveals himself to be Lena's father. 

Mr Castillo's group returns to Paris, but loses to Ms Carré's group. Lena suggests they put on their version of The Nutcracker anyway. However, she, Henri, and Frank are transported to a time traveller's ball in 1905. Nico also ends up there, meaning all of them must be Heirs. It's revealed his mother Quinn runs the Bureau, and that all this information was kept from him since he was raised to be an agent. They manage to get back in time to finish the show by making a deal with Quinn that the Chosen One will turn themself in when they turn 18. Romy has Lena's timepiece and keeps using it to manipulate things in her favour.

Cast

Main
 Jessica Lord as Lena Grisky
 Hannah Dodd as Thea Raphael (main, seasons 1–2; guest, season 3)
 Rory J. Saper as Max Alvarez (seasons 1–2)
 Eubha Akilade as Ines Le Breton
 Hiran Abeysekera as Dash Khan (main, season 1; guest, season 2)
 Castle Rock as Jeff Chase
 Christy O’Donnell as Henri Duquet
 Chloe Fox as Bree Girling (recurring, seasons 1–2, main, season 3)
 Caitlin-Rose Lacey as Kennedy Mather (recurring, seasons 1–2, main, season 3)
 Terique Jarrett as Isaac Portier (seasons 2–3)
 Seán Óg Cairns as Frank (recurring, seasons 1–2, main, season 3)
 Audrey Hall as Claudine Renault (recurring, seasons 1–2, main, season 3)
 Jake Swift as Nico Michaels (season 3)
 Isabelle Allen as Romy Jensen (season 3)

Recurring 
 Lawrence Walker as Pinky
 Luca Varsalona as Clive
 Katherine Erhardy as Gabrielle Carré
 Ingo Brosch as Victor Duquet
 Chris Baltus as Etienne (season 1)
 Javone Prince as Oscar
 Edward Kagutuzi as Young Oscar
 Rik Young as Armando Castillo
 Elisa Doughty as Princess Alexandra
 Sophie Airdien as Francie Parks (season 1)
 Manuel Pacific as Reuben Bello
 Rameet Rauli as Alexa "Lex" Dosne (recurring, season 2; guest, season 3)
 Esther Lindebergh as Jenna Bicks (seasons 2–3)
 Louis Davison as Simon (season 3)
 Josh Burdett as Jack Jensen (season 3)
 Kirsty Mitchell as Quinn Michaels (season 3)

Episodes

Season 1 (2018)

Season 2 (2019)

Season 3 (2020)

Production
Find Me in Paris is a French-German series produced by Cottonwood Media in association with ZDF, ZDF Enterprises, and the Opera National de Paris. The production budget for season one was $12.5 million.

Filming for the third season commenced in July 2019, and wrapped on November 28, 2019.

Broadcast

References

External links 
 

2018 French television series debuts
2018 German television series debuts
2020 French television series endings
2020 German television series endings
2010s children's television series
2010s LGBT-related drama television series
2010s time travel television series
2020s children's television series
2020s LGBT-related drama television series
2020s time travel television series
Alternate history television series
Dance television shows
English-language television shows
French children's television series
French fantasy television series
French time travel television series
German children's television series
German fantasy television series
German time travel television series
Hulu original programming
Hulu children's programming
Science fantasy television series
Television series about ballet
Television series about teenagers
Television series set in the 1900s
Television series set in 2018
Television series set in 2019
Television series set in 2020
Television shows set in Paris
Television shows filmed in France
Television shows filmed in Belgium